The following is a navigational list of notable literary works which are set at Christmas time, or contain Christmas amongst the central themes.

Novels and novellas
Agatha Christie, Hercule Poirot's Christmas
Charles Dickens, A Christmas Carol
Charles Dickens, The Chimes
Charles Dickens, The Cricket on the Hearth
Charles Dickens, The Battle of Life
Charles Dickens, The Haunted Man and The Ghost's Bargain
Janet Evanovich, Visions of Sugar Plums
Frederick Forsyth, The Shepherd
Jostein Gaarder, The Christmas Mystery
John Grisham, Skipping Christmas
Maureen Johnson, John Green and Lauren Myracle, Let It Snow
C. S. Lewis, The Lion, the Witch and the Wardrobe
Christopher Moore, The Stupidest Angel: A Heartwarming Tale of Christmas Terror

Short stories
Hans Christian Andersen, "The Fir-Tree"
Truman Capote, "A Christmas Memory" (published in Mademoiselle)
John Cheever, "Christmas is a Sad Season for the Poor"
Agatha Christie, The Adventure of the Christmas Pudding
Agatha Christie, A Christmas Tragedy
Fyodor Dostoevsky, "A Christmas Tree and a Wedding"
Fyodor Dostoevsky, "The Beggar Boy at Christ's Christmas Tree" (from A Writer's Diary)
Arthur Conan Doyle, "The Adventure of the Blue Carbuncle"
Nikolai Gogol, "Christmas Eve" (from Evenings on a Farm Near Dikanka)
O. Henry, The Gift of the Magi
E. T. A. Hoffmann, "Nussknacker und Mausekönig" (The Nutcracker and the Mouse King)
Leo Tolstoy, "Papa Panov's Special Christmas" (translation of Saillens)
Dylan Thomas, A Child's Christmas in Wales
Philip Van Doren Stern, The Greatest Gift 
Kurt Vonnegut, While Mortals Sleep (book of short stories)

Children's 
 Janet and Allan Ahlberg, The Jolly Christmas Postman
 Maya Angelou, Amazing Peace
L. Frank Baum, The Life and Adventures of Santa Claus
 Julia Donaldson, and Axel Scheffler, Stick Man
 Richard Paul Evans, The Christmas Box, The Light of Christmas
Cornelia Funke, When Santa Fell to Earth
Dr. Seuss, How the Grinch Stole Christmas!
Astrid Lindgren, Brenda Brave Helps Grandmother (Kajsa Kavat hjälper mormor)
Astrid Lindgren, A Calf for Christmas (När Bäckhultarn for till stan)
Astrid Lindgren, Christmas in the Stable (Jul i stallet)
Astrid Lindgren, The Runaway Sleigh Ride (Titta Madicken, det snöar!)
Astrid Lindgren, The Tomten (Tomte är vaken)
Astrid Lindgren, The Tomten and the Fox (Räven och Tomten)
 Martin Waddell, Room for a Little One: A Christmas Tale

Poetry
"Old Santeclaus with Much Delight"
Clement Clarke Moore, "A Visit from St. Nicholas" (also known as "'Twas the Night before Christmas")
George Robert Sims, Christmas Day in the Workhouse
T. S. Eliot, "Journey of the Magi"
Viktor Rydberg, Tomten

Collections
 Bettye Collier-Thomas, A Treasury of African American Christmas Stories
 David Sedaris, Holidays on Ice
J. R. R. Tolkien, Letters from Father Christmas
 Jeanette Winterson, Christmas Days

Nonfiction

Francis Pharcellus Church, "Yes, Virginia, there is a Santa Claus" (1897 newspaper editorial)

References 

Christmas
 
Christmas
literature